Alain Frachon (born 1950) is a French journalist for Le Monde, France's centre-left newspaper of record, and the author of several books.

Early life
Alain Frachon was born in 1950. He graduated from the Centre de Formation des Journalistes (CFJ) in 1974.

Career
Frachon began his career at the Agence France-Presse, where he worked from 1975 to 1985. He was a foreign correspondent for Le Monde in Jerusalem and Washington, D.C. He succeeded Érik Izraelewicz as the interim editor-in-chief from November 2012 to March 2013.

Frachon is the author of several books.

Selected works

References

Living people
1950 births